Richard Reid Dobell,  (January 27, 1836 – January 11, 1902) was a Canadian businessman and politician.

Biography
Born in Liverpool, England, and educated at Liverpool College, he came to Quebec in 1857 and started a lumber business. With his brother-in-law, Thomas Beckett, he founder the firm R. R. Dobell & Co, Quebec, at one time one of the largest of its kind in Canada. He took an active interest in public affairs, was elected President of the Quebec Board of Trade, and was a Harbour Commissioner for that city. He actively promoted the cold storage principle in transatlantic steamers, and was President of the Cold Storage Company of Quebec. Other appointments included Director of the Quebec Railway Bridge Company.

In 1895 he unsuccessfully stood as an independent candidate for the House of Commons of Canada, but the next year was elected as the Liberal candidate for the riding of Quebec West in the 1896 federal election, and was re-elected in 1900. From 1896 to 1902, he was a Minister without Portfolio in the cabinet of Wilfrid Laurier. He was a prominent supporter of the cause of Imperial federation, and was a founder of the British Empire League.

He died on 13 January 1902 of a head injury caused by falling from a horse while visiting his son-in-law at Folkestone, England.

Family
Dobell married Elizabeth Frances Macpherson, daughter of Sir David Lewis Macpherson, businessman and later Canadian senator.
His son, Charles Macpherson Dobell, was a Major General in the British Army.

Archives 
There is a Richard Reid Dobell fonds at Library and Archives Canada.

References
 
 

1837 births
1902 deaths
Accidental deaths in England
English emigrants to pre-Confederation Quebec
Liberal Party of Canada MPs
Members of the House of Commons of Canada from Quebec
Members of the King's Privy Council for Canada
Pre-Confederation Canadian businesspeople
Businesspeople from Liverpool
Politicians from Liverpool
Immigrants to the Province of Canada
Anglophone Quebec people
People educated at Liverpool College
19th-century English businesspeople